Christiane Cegavske is an American artist and stop motion animator.

She is primarily known for her animated film Blood Tea and Red String and for having done the animated segments to the film The Heart Is Deceitful Above All Things. She has also made a short film Blood and Sunflowers and has done animation for the TV series X-Chromosome.

See also
Jan Švankmajer
Ladislas Starevich
Ray Harryhausen
Jiří Barta
Brothers Quay

References

External links
 
 

1971 births
American animators
American animated film directors
American women film directors
Living people
American people of Czech descent
American people of Polish descent
Stop motion animators
American women animators